Third law may refer to:

In physical sciences
 Newton's third law of motion, one of Newton's laws of motion
 Third law of thermodynamics
 Kepler's Third law of planetary motion

In biology
 Mendel's third law, or the Law of Dominance

Albums
Third Law (album), 2016 album by Roly Porter

See also 
 Rule of thirds
 Rule of three (disambiguation)